The men's 200 metre individual medley event at the 2010 Asian Games took place on 17 November 2010 at Guangzhou Aoti Aquatics Centre.

There were 23 competitors from 16 countries who took part in this event. Three heats were held. The heat in which a swimmer competed did not formally matter for advancement, as the swimmers with the top eight times from the entire field qualified for the finals.

Ken Takakuwa from Japan won the gold medal with 1 minute 58.31 seconds.

Schedule
All times are China Standard Time (UTC+08:00)

Records

Results

Heats

Final

References
 16th Asian Games Results

External links 
 Men's 200m Individual Medley Heats Official Website
 Men's 200m Individual Medley Ev.No.30 Final Official Website

Swimming at the 2010 Asian Games